Emma is an unincorporated community in Eden Township, LaGrange County, Indiana.

History
Emma once contained a post office which was first called Eden Mills. The post office operated as Eden Mills from 1868 until 1875, was renamed Emma in 1880, and closed in 1903.

Geography

References

Unincorporated communities in LaGrange County, Indiana
Unincorporated communities in Indiana